The Chukanov Merchant House is located in Petropavl, Kazhakstan, along Constitution Street.

History
The house was built in 1890 and consists of two floors. The building belonged to a wealthy Chukanov tradesman, who was a Kalmyk by ethnicity.

The first floor was rented out to a businessman named Davidov, who ran a café on this level. The Chukanov family lived on the second floor.

During the February Revolution, from February 22 to December 5 in the building was occupied by the Soviet Workers' and Soldiers' Deputies. 

In the period of Civil war in Soviet Union, brutal fighting occurred in the building (May – June, 1918).

Architecture
The building consists of two floors. The floor plan has a characteristic Russian-‘L’-shaped form. The architecture of the two floors are very different from each other. The first floor contains corridors and a room, and on the second floor is a trading room and utility rooms. 

The street facades have decorative masonry all along the entire second floor. On the main facade, there are two remote balconies, decorated with special metal grilles. 

The building is an example of the historical layout of the provincial merchant city, which is typical of the 19th century and beginning of the 20th century. The architecture is expressed in the planned integrated development of brick buildings for residential and commercial purposes.

The Chukanov (tradesman) house is recognized as part of the architectural heritage of the central part of the city.

Literature
 Архив департамента финансов Северо-Казахстанской области.
 ГАСКО. Ф. 3037. Инв. № 8211.
 ЦГА РК. Ф. 566 «Городская управа. 1861–1918гг.».

Buildings and structures in North Kazakhstan Region
Houses in Kazakhstan